The Sunday Child or  De Zondagsjongen  is a 1992 Dutch film directed by Pieter Verhoeff.
Filming of Cherry Duyns' debut novel about the life of one in 1944 from a German-born Dutch boy. It is June 1988. On the way to his family in Germany is confronted the man in the train with football fans who will attend the match Netherlands-Germany for the European football championships. The revival of anti-German sentiments reminiscent of his youth. Sunday is a boy with flashbacks larded film about loyalty, love, betrayal and liberation.

Cast
Rik van Uffelen	... 	Anton - Age 44
Tom van Hezik	... 	Anton (aged 8)
Magdalena Ritter	... 	Moeder
Toon Agterberg	... 	Vader
Franz Braunshausen	... 	Otto
Gerard Thoolen	... 	Buschmann
Vastert van Aardenne	... 	Anton - Age 22
Ann Hasekamp	... 	Grootmoeder
Sonya Bayer	... 	Angelika
Robert Zimmerling	... 	Grootvader in Duitsland
Malvina Möller-Bradford	... 	Grootmoeder in Duitsland
Ivo Dolder	... 	Sturm
Georg Vietje	... 	Winckler

External links 
 

Dutch drama films
1992 films
1990s Dutch-language films
Films directed by Pieter Verhoeff
Films shot in the Netherlands